Pennsylvania Route 257 (PA 257) is a  state highway located in Venango county in Pennsylvania.  The southern terminus is at U.S. Route 322 (US 322) in Cranberry Township.  The northern terminus is at US 62 in Oil City.

Route description

PA 257 begins at an intersection with US 322 in Cranberry Township, heading north on a three-lane undivided road with a center left-turn lane. The route passes through a mix of farmland and woodland with residential and commercial development, heading east of the Cranberry Mall past the US 322 intersection and running west of UPMC Northwest hospital. PA 257 continues past homes and businesses in the community of Seneca before heading into wooded areas with residences. The route passes to the east of Woodland Heights through forests as a three-lane road with one northbound lane and two southbound lanes. PA 257 curves northeast and comes to its northern terminus at US 62 on the border of Cranberry Township and the city of Oil City.

Major intersections

See also

References

External links

Pennsylvania Highways: PA 257

257